Handmade or hand made may refer to:

Handicraft, where useful and decorative objects are made by hand
Handmade (Jimmy Rankin album), 2003
Handmade (Hindi Zahra album), 2010
Handmade (The Ongoing Concept album), 2015
Handmade, a 1970 album by Mason Williams
Hand Made, a 1993 album by Mitchel Forman
HandMade Films, a British film production and distribution company
Handmade: Britain's Best Woodworker, a British reality television series
Handmade, a former division of the Rhino Entertainment record label

See also
 
 
 Handmaid, a personal maid or female servant
 The Handmaid (disambiguation)
 Made hand, a poker hand that does not need improvement to win